Quảng Minh is a commune (xã) and village in Việt Yên District, Bắc Giang Province, in northeastern Vietnam. As of 2009 the population of Quang Minh is 4,610.

References

Populated places in Bắc Giang province
Communes of Bắc Giang province